The Marquesas Islands are the island group farthest from any continent in the world, lying between  south of the equator and approximately  northeast of Tahiti. A pair of volcanic archipelagoes, they fall naturally into two geographical divisions, The northwestern group consists of Eïao, Hatutu (Hatutaa), Motu One, and the islands centered on the large island of Nuku Hiva: Motu Iti (Hatu Iti), Ua Pou, Motu Oa and Ua Huka. The southeastern group consists of Fatu Uku, Tahuata, Moho Tani (Motane), Terihi, Fatu Hiva and Motu Nao (Thomasset Rock), clustered around the main island of Hiva `Oa which is the largest and most populous island of the southeastern group.

With the exception of Motu One, all the islands of the Marquesas are of volcanic origin.

The Marquesas are one of the few island groups in Polynesia where precipitation is not abundant. Most of the islands are subject to frequent drought conditions due to their geographic location and periodic fluctuations in the normally prevailing easterly winds. Although the islands lie within the tropics, they are the first major break in the prevailing easterly winds spawned from the extraordinarily dry (from an atmospheric perspective) Humboldt Current. Unlike the rest of French Polynesia, most rain falls during the cooler months, with May to July usually the wettest and November the driest.

Because of their exceptionally variable climate, the islands are subject to extreme drought and flood conditions. This has led to historical fluctuations in water supply, which has been a crucial factor in the sustainability of human populations in certain sections of the various islands throughout the archipelago. This is especially evident in the low historical population of Ua Huka (maximum elevation 2,812 ft.) and the intermittent inhabitability of Eiao (maximum elevation 1,890 ft.).

The islands lack both coastal plains and coral reefs. As a result habitation is generally found only where streams run down from the mountains in narrow valleys. Agricultural products include copra, taro, breadfruit, coffee beans and vanilla. The islands have also developed a tourist industry.

The Marquesas Islands are thought to have formed from a center of upwelling magma called the Marquesas hotspot.

See also
 List of Marquesas Islands

References